Umm Qarn is a village in Qatar, located in the municipality of Al Daayen. Located just off Al Shamal Highway, the village hosts the municipal office and currently serves as the municipality's administrative seat. 

The settlement derives its name from local geographical features. Umm Qarn translates to 'mother of flat shaped hill'.

Geography
Umm Qarn is situated in eastern Qatar, about 35 km away from the capital Doha. It is located in the northern portion of the Al Daayen Municipality. The villages of Abu Thailah and Simaisma are nearby.

Landmarks
An 580-acre stud farm, Umm Qarn Stud Farm, is found in the village. It is a luxury stable which houses dozens of champion horses. Most food requirements are imported from abroad except during winter when grass seed originating from the US is planted.

Developments
The Qatar National Master Plan (QNMP) is described as a "spatial representation of the Qatar National Vision 2030". As part of the QNMP's Urban Centre plan, which aims to implement development strategies in 28 central hubs that will serve their surrounding communities, Umm Qarn has been designated a Town Centre, which is the third-highest designation. 

Al Daayen Municipality is developing Umm Qarn as a retail and administrative center for the municipality's northern settlements, such as Simaisma. Currently, the village already has a municipal office, the municipality's only primary healthcare center, a civil defense center, a police station and two primary schools. Officials have discussed the future possibility of constructing a metro station in the village. About four-fifths of the village's overall area stands vacant. New projects have been taking place to the north-east of the current village nucleus, particularly a public school and a new governments services complex. Municipal officials are planning to create new office and retail spaces near the government services complex. The government services complex will be 74,744 m2 and contain emergency and police services, a mosque and a primary health care centre. A 41,267 m2 social centre is also in the works.

Agriculture
Annually, over 300,000 seedlings are grown in Umm Qarn's nursery. Most of these seedlings are distributed to Qatar's various government ministries. The nursery covers an area of about 20 hectares and has 7 growing areas. A tree nursery in nearby Rawdat Bakheela in Al Khor Municipality was rehabilitated in 2008, and is used by the government for research and tree production.

Education
The following schools are located in Umm Qarn:

External links
Umm Qarn: Qatar, Geographic.org

References

Populated places in Al Daayen